La Léchère is a commune in the Savoie department in the Auvergne-Rhône-Alpes region in south-eastern France. It is situated in the Isère valley, between Albertville and Moûtiers. It was formed in 1972 by the merger of the former communes Notre-Dame-de-Briançon, Celliers, Doucy, Naves, Petit-Cœur and Pussy. On 1 January 2019, the former communes Bonneval and Feissons-sur-Isère were merged into La Léchère.

See also
Communes of the Savoie department

References

Communes of Savoie